Eslamabad (also Romanized as Eslāmābād; also known as Qārlaq-e Kūchek) is a village in Tork-e Sharqi Rural District, Jowkar District, Malayer County, Hamadan Province, Iran. At the 2006 census, its population was 3,717, in 870 families.

References 

Populated places in Malayer County